Otterthal is a municipality in the Industrieviertel of Lower Austria, Austria. 61.72 percent of the municipality is forested. There are 25 agricultural companies. 266 persons are employed.  The activity rate was 48.31%.

Population

References

Cities and towns in Neunkirchen District, Austria